The Reform and Development Party is a political party in Morocco.

History and profile
The party was founded by Abderrahman El Kuhen in June 2001.

In the parliamentary election held on 27 September 2002, the party won 3 out of 325 seats. In the next parliamentary election, held on 7 September 2007, the party did not win any seats.

References

2001 establishments in Morocco
Political parties established in 2001
Political parties in Morocco